This article lists political parties in Malawi. Malawi has a multi-party system with over 40 registered political parties. The political process in Malawi is such that parties are voted into power. Parties participate in an electoral process. The parties with the most representation in the National Assembly are the People's Party (PP), Malawi Congress Party (MCP), United Democratic Front (UDF), and Democratic Progressive Party (DPP).

The rise of multi-party rule in Malawi 
The Nyasaland African Congress led the anti-colonial movements in Malawi under the leadership of Kamuzu Banda. When the NAC was banned it changed its name to the Malawi Congress Party which led Malawi to independence and continued to rule from 1964 until 1994, under a one party state system. This system was challenged by political activists throughout the years, however Banda's dictatorship suppressed opposition, creating a culture of silence.

By 1992, Chakufwa Chihana, a trade unionist, lecturer and activist, became the catalyst for a multi-party system in Malawi. He led an underground political movement that aimed at democratic multi-party rule. He was the first person to openly challenge the system. He was arrested in 1992 when he returned to Malawi and his arrest heightened both domestic and international pressure. Chihana's freedom was supported by Amnesty International as well as the Robert F. Kennedy Association. Due to growing pressure, Banda agreed to hold a referendum to let the public decide on the issue of multi-party rule. During the 1993 referendum, Malawians voted for a multi-party system and it became legal to form political parties in Malawi. Chihana's movement lead to the formation of his party, Alliance for Democracy (AFORD). Other prominent parties formed and emerged as well, notably the United Democratic Front which was founded by Bakili Muluzi. Malawi's first multi-party elections were held in 1994. The MCP contested in these elections as well. The UDF under the charismatic Bakili Muluzi won these elections becoming the first party that was democratically voted into power in Malawi. Chihana's party came third, and he was awarded the position of second Vice-President. However, Chihana has made his mark on Malawi's history and is known as the "father of democracy" in Malawi. Malawi had peacefully ushered in multi-party rule which continues until today.

Active parties

Parties with representation in parliament

Other parties 
Mgwirizano Coalition
Malawi Democratic Party
Malawi Forum for Unity and Development (MAFUNDE)
Movement for Genuine Democratic Change
National Unity Party (NUP)
People's Progressive Movement
People's Transformation Party (PETRA)
Republican Party
National Democratic Alliance
Umodzi Party (UP) - Founded in 2013 by John E Chisi

Table of political parties

Party coalitions

Party by year 

2014–Present (DPP)
2012 - 2014 (PP)
2009 – 2012 (DPP)
1994 – 2009 (UDF)
1964 – 1994 (MCP)

See also
 Cabinet of Malawi
Politics of Malawi
 Elections in Malawi
 List of political parties by country

References 

Malawi
Political parties
 
Political parties
Malawi